Chi Jinyu (born 16 January 1989) is a Chinese former footballer.

References

1989 births
Living people
Chinese footballers
Chinese expatriate footballers
Association football defenders
Singapore Premier League players
China League One players
Dalian Shide F.C. players
Jiangxi Beidamen F.C. players
Qingdao F.C. players
Chinese expatriate sportspeople in Singapore
Expatriate footballers in Singapore